Gerald Raymond Lee Jr. (born November 23, 1987) is a Finnish professional basketball player who last played for Ironi Nes Ziona of the Israeli Premier League. He played college basketball for Old Dominion University.

Basketball career
Lee began his professional career in 2004 with UU-Korihait of the Finnish Korisliiga, and played with them for two seasons.

From 2006 to 2010, he played college basketball at the Old Dominion University, with the Old Dominion Monarchs.

From 2010 to 2012 he played in the Italian Legadue Basket, first with Snaidero Udine and then with Prima Veroli.

In August 2012, he signed a two-year contract with Budućnost Podgorica of Montenegro. He left Budućnost after one season.

In September 2013, he signed a one-year deal with the Romanian team CSU Asesoft Ploiești. In July 2014, he extended his contract with Asesoft for one more season. On February 2, 2015, he left Asesoft Ploiești and signed with UCAM Murcia of Spain for the rest of the 2014–15 ACB season.

On September 16, 2015, he signed a one-year deal with Steaua București of Romania.

On September 13, 2016, Lee signed with French club Le Mans Sarthe Basket. He left Le Mans after appearing in only three games, and on October 13, 2016, he signed with Helsinki Seagulls for the rest of the season.

On August 2, 2017, Lee signed with Israeli club Maccabi Ashdod for the 2017–18 season. Lee helped Ashdod to reach the 2018 Israeli League Playoffs, where they eventually lost to Hapoel Tel Aviv. In 28 games played during the 2017–18 season, Lee averaged 11.2 points and 4.9 rebounds per game, shooting 58.9 percent from the field.

On July 6, 2018, Lee signed a one-year deal with Ironi Nes Ziona. On January 8, 2019, Lee parted ways with Nes Ziona after appearing in 22 games.

National team career
Lee is a member of the Finland national basketball team. He played for them at the FIBA EuroBasket 2011, FIBA EuroBasket 2013 and 2014 FIBA Basketball World Cup.

Personal life
His American-born father Gerald Lee Sr. played in Finland from 1973 to 1997. He also played 8 matches for Finland national team in 1992.

References

External links
Gerald Lee at realgm.com
Gerald Lee at acb.com
Gerald Lee at eurobasket.com
Gerald Lee at eurocupbasketball.com
Gerald Lee at fiba.com

1987 births
Living people
ABA League players
American expatriate basketball people in France
American expatriate basketball people in Israel
American expatriate basketball people in Italy
American expatriate basketball people in Montenegro
American expatriate basketball people in Romania
American expatriate basketball people in Spain
American men's basketball players
CB Murcia players
Centers (basketball)
CSU Asesoft Ploiești players
Finnish expatriate basketball people in Italy
Finnish expatriate basketball people in Spain
Finnish expatriate basketball people in France
Finnish expatriate basketball people in Romania
Finnish men's basketball players
Finnish people of African-American descent
Helsinki Seagulls players
Ironi Nes Ziona B.C. players
KK Budućnost players
Le Mans Sarthe Basket players
Liga ACB players
Maccabi Ashdod B.C. players
Old Dominion Monarchs men's basketball players
Pallalcesto Amatori Udine players
People from Uusikaupunki
Veroli Basket players
2014 FIBA Basketball World Cup players
Sportspeople from Southwest Finland